Of Human Feelings is an album by American jazz saxophonist, composer, and bandleader Ornette Coleman. It was recorded on April 25, 1979, at CBS Studios in New York City with his band Prime Time, which featured guitarists Charlie Ellerbee and Bern Nix, bassist Jamaaladeen Tacuma, and drummers Calvin Weston and Coleman's son Denardo. It followed the saxophonist's failed attempt to record a direct-to-disc session earlier in March of the same year and was the first jazz album to be recorded digitally in the United States.

The album's jazz-funk music continued Coleman's harmolodic approach to improvisation with Prime Time, whom he had introduced on his 1975 album Dancing in Your Head. This approach emphasized natural rhythmic and emotional responses in a way that Coleman compared to a spirit of collective consciousness. He also drew on rhythm and blues influences from early in his career for Of Human Feelings, which had shorter and more distinct compositions than Dancing in Your Head, while applying free jazz principles from his music during the 1960s to elements of funk.

Following a change in his management, Coleman signed with Island Records, and Of Human Feelings was released in 1982 by its subsidiary label Antilles Records. Critics generally praised the album's expressive music and harmolodic approach, but it made little commercial impact and went out of print. Coleman enlisted his son Denardo as manager after a dispute with his former managers over the album's royalties, a change that inspired him to perform publicly again during the 1980s.

Background 

By the end of the 1960s, Ornette Coleman had become one of the most influential musicians in jazz after pioneering its most controversial subgenre, free jazz, which jazz critics and musicians initially derided for its deviation from conventional structures of harmony and tonality. In the mid-1970s, he stopped recording free jazz, recruited electric instrumentalists, and pursued a new creative theory he called harmolodics. According to Coleman's theory, all the musicians are able to play individual melodies in any key, and still sound coherent as a group. He taught his young sidemen this new improvisational and ensemble approach, based on their individual tendencies, and discouraged them from being influenced by conventional styles. Coleman likened this group ethic to a spirit of "collective consciousness" that stresses "human feelings" and "biological rhythms", and said that he wanted the music, rather than himself, to be successful. He also started to incorporate elements from other styles into his music, including rock influences such as the electric guitar and non-Western rhythms played by Moroccan and Nigerian musicians.

Of Human Feelings was a continuation of the harmolodics approach Coleman had applied with Prime Time, an electric quartet introduced on his 1975 album Dancing in Your Head. The group comprised guitarists Charlie Ellerbee and Bern Nix, bassist Jamaaladeen Tacuma, and drummers Ronald Shannon Jackson and Denardo Coleman, Ornette Coleman's son. Tacuma was still in high school when Coleman enlisted him, and first recorded with Prime Time in 1975 for the album Body Meta, which was released in 1978. Tacuma had played in an ensemble for jazz organist Charles Earland, but Earland dismissed him as he felt audiences gave excessive attention to his playing. Coleman found Tacuma's playing ideal for harmolodics and encouraged him not to change. Although Coleman's theory initially challenged his knowledge and perception of music, Tacuma came to like the unconventional role each band member was given as a soloist and melodist: "When we read Ornette's music we have his notes, but we listen for his phrases and phrase the way he wants to. I can take the same melody, then, and phrase it like I want to, and those notes will determine the phrasing, the rhythm, the harmony – all of that."

Recording and production 

In March 1979, Coleman went to RCA Records' New York studio to produce an album with Prime Time by direct-to-disc recording. They had mechanical problems with the studio equipment and the recording was rejected. The failed session was a project under Phrase Text, Coleman's music publishing company. He wanted to set up his own record company with the same name, and chose his old friend Kunle Mwanga as his manager. In April, Mwanga arranged another session at CBS Studios in New York City, and Coleman recorded Of Human Feelings there on April 25; the session was originally titled Fashion Faces. Jackson did not record with the band; instead, Calvin Weston was hired in his place to play simultaneously with Denardo Coleman. They recorded all the album's songs on the first take without any equipment problems.

The album's recording session was captured using a Sony PCM-1600 two-track digital recorder, a rare item at the time. According to journalist Howard Mandel, the passages played by the band sounded neither very soft or loud on the album, because it had been mixed with a middle-frequency range and compressed dynamics. Because of the equipment used, Coleman did not embellish the album with added effects and avoided overdubbing, multi-tracking, and remixing. According to him, Of Human Feelings was the first jazz album to be digitally recorded in the United States.

Composition and performance 

According to The Concise Oxford Dictionary of Music (2004), Of Human Feelings features jazz-funk, a type of music that developed at the turn of the 1970s and was characterized by intricate rhythmic patterns, a recurrent bass line, and Latin rhythmic elements. Lloyd Sachs of the Chicago Sun-Times wrote that, although Coleman was not viewed as a jazz fusion artist, the album can be described as such because of its combination of free jazz and funk. Glenn Kenny disagreed and felt its boisterous style had more in common with the no wave genre and the artists of New York City's downtown music scene such as John Zorn. Jazz writer Stuart Nicholson viewed it as the culmination of Coleman's musical principles that dated back to his free jazz music in 1960, but reappropriated with a funk-oriented backbeat. According to jazz critic Barry McRae, "it was as if Coleman was translating the concept of the famous double quartet" from his 1961 album Free Jazz to what was required to perform jazz-funk.

Coleman incorporated traditional structures and rhythms, and other elements from the rhythm and blues music he had played early his career. According to Mandel, the album's simple, brisk music was more comparable to a coherent R&B band than jazz fusion. Although Coleman still performed the melodies on a song, he employed two guitarists for contrast to make each pair of guitarist and drummer responsible for either the rhythm or melody. Ellerbee provided accented linear counterpoint and Nix played variations of the song's melody, while Denardo Coleman and Weston played both polyrhythms and backbeats. On songs such as "Jump Street" and "Love Words", Ellerbee incorporated distortion into his guitar playing, which gave the songs a thicker texture. Tacuma and Ornette Coleman's instrumental responses were played as the foreground to the less prominent guitars. McRae remarked that Coleman and Prime Time exchanged "directional hints" throughout the songs, as one player changed key and the others modulated accordingly. The band made no attempt to harmonize their radically different parts while playing.

Of Human Feelings features shorter and more distinct compositions than Dancing in Your Head. "Sleep Talk", "Air Ship", and "Times Square" were originally performed by Coleman during his concerts in 1978 under the names "Dream Talking", "Meta", and "Writing in the Streets", respectively. "What Is the Name of That Song?" was titled as a sly reference to two of his older compositions, "Love Eyes" and "Forgotten Songs" (also known as "Holiday for Heroes"), whose themes were played concurrently and transfigured by Prime Time. The theme from "Forgotten Songs", originally from Coleman's 1972 album Skies of America, was used as a refrain. "Jump Street" is a blues piece, "Air Ship" comprises a six-bar riff, and the atonal "Times Square" has futuristic dance themes. "Love Words" heavily uses polymodality, a central feature of harmolodics, and juxtaposes Coleman's extended solo against a dense, rhythmically complex backdrop. Nicholson observed West African rhythms and collective improvisation rooted in New Orleans jazz on "Love Words", and suggested that "Sleep Talk" was derived from the opening bassoon solo in Igor Stravinsky's 1913 orchestral work The Rite of Spring. The latter track is led off by Tacuma's bass playing and, according to Premier Guitar journalist Nick Millevoi, is an ideal example of Prime Time's aesthetic and sound.

Marketing and sales 

A few weeks after Of Human Feelings was recorded, Mwanga went to Japan to negotiate a deal with Trio Records to have the album released on Phrase Text. Trio, who had previously released a compilation of Coleman's 1966 to 1971 live performances in Paris, prepared to press the album once Mwanga provided the label with the record stamper. Coleman was also set to perform his song "Skies of America" with the NHK Symphony Orchestra, but cancelled both deals upon Mwanga's return from Japan. Mwanga immediately quit after less than four months as Coleman's manager. In 1981, Coleman hired Stan and Sid Bernstein as his managers, who sold the album's recording tapes to Island Records. He signed with the record label that year, and Of Human Feelings was released in 1982 on Island's subsidiary jazz label Antilles Records. Billboard magazine published a front-page story at the time about its distinction as both the first digital album recorded in New York City and the first digital jazz album recorded by an American label.

According to jazz writer Francis Davis, "a modest commercial breakthrough seemed imminent" for Coleman, who appeared to be regaining his celebrity. German musicologist Peter Niklas Wilson said the album may have been the most tuneful and commercial-sounding of his career at that point. The album's clean mix and relatively short tracks were interpreted as an attempt for radio airplay by Mandel, who described its production as "the surface consistency that would put it in the pop sphere". Of Human Feelings had no success on the American pop charts, however, only charting on the Top Jazz Albums, where it spent 26 weeks and peaked at number 15. Because the record offered a middle ground between funk and jazz, McRae argued that it consequently appealed to neither demographic of listeners. Sound & Vision critic Brent Butterworth speculated that it was overlooked because it had electric instruments, rock and funk drumming, and did not conform to what he felt was the hokey image of jazz that many of the genre's fans preferred. The album later went out of print.

Critical reception 

Of Human Feelings received considerable acclaim from contemporary critics. Reviewing the album for Esquire in 1982, Gary Giddins hailed it as another landmark recording from Coleman and his most accomplished work of harmolodics, partly because of compositions which he found clearly expressed and occasionally timeless. In his opinion, the discordant keys radically transmute conventional polyphony and may be the most challenging part for listeners, who he said should concentrate on Coleman's playing and "let the maelstrom resolve itself around his center". Giddins also highlighted the melody of "Sleep Talk", deeming it among the best of the saxophonist's career. Kofi Natambu from the Detroit Metro Times wrote that Coleman's synergetic approach displays expressive immediacy rather than superficial technical flair while calling the record "a multi-tonal mosaic of great power, humor, color, wit, sensuality, compassion and tenderness". He found the songs inspirational, danceable, and encompassing developments in African-American music over the previous century. Robert Christgau called its "warm, listenable harmolodic funk" an artistic "breakthrough if not a miracle". He found its exchange of rhythms and simple melodies heartfelt and sophisticated, writing in The Village Voice, "the way the players break into ripples of song only to ebb back into the tideway is participatory democracy at its most practical and utopian."

Purist critics in jazz complained about the music's incorporation of danceable beats and electric guitar. In Stereo Review, Chris Albertson deemed the combination of saxophone and bizarre funk occasionally captivating but ultimately unfocused. Dan Sullivan of the Los Angeles Times believed the album's supporters in "hip rock circles" had overlooked flaws, arguing that Tacuma and Coleman's playing sound like a unique "beacon of clarity" amid an incessant background. Leonard Feather wrote in the Toledo Blade that the music is stylistically ambiguous, potentially controversial, and difficult to assess but interesting enough to warrant a listen.

At the end of 1982, Of Human Feelings the year's best album by Billboard editor Peter Keepnews, who viewed it as a prime example of fusing free jazz with modern funk. In year-end lists for The Boston Phoenix, James Hunter and Howard Hampton ranked the album number one and number four, respectively. It was voted 13th best in the Pazz & Jop, an annual poll of American critics nationwide, published in The Village Voice. Christgau, the poll's supervisor, ranked it number one in an accompanying list, and in 1990 he named it the second-best album of the 1980s.

Legacy 

Coleman received $25,000 for the publishing rights to Of Human Feelings but said his managers sold it for less than the recording costs and that he did not receive any of its royalties. According to Stan Bernstein, Coleman had financial expectations that were "unrealistic in this business unless you're Michael Jackson". Antilles label executive Ron Goldstein felt the $25,000 Coleman received was neither a great nor a fair amount for someone in jazz. After he had gone over budget to record a follow-up album, Island did not release it nor pick up their option on him, and in 1983, he left the Bernstein Agency. He chose Denardo Coleman to manage his career while overcoming his reticence of public performance, which had been rooted in his distrust of doing business with a predominantly White music industry. According to Nicholson, "the man once accused of standing on the throat of jazz was welcomed back to the touring circuits with both curiosity and affection" during the 1980s. Coleman did not record another album for six years and instead performed internationally with Prime Time.

Retrospective appraisals have been favorable to Of Human Feelings. In a 1986 article for The New York Times on Coleman's work with Prime Time, Robert Palmer said the album was still innovative and radical by the standards of other music in 1982, three years after it was recorded. Because writers and musicians had heard its test pressing in 1979, the album's mix of jazz improvisation and gritty, punk and funk-derived energy sounded "prophetic" when it was released, Palmer explained. "The album is clearly the progenitor of much that has sounded radically new in the ongoing fusion of punk rock, black dance rhythms, and free jazz." AllMusic critic Scott Yanow said although Coleman's compositions never achieved popularity, they succeeded within the context of an album that showcased his distinctive saxophone style, which was high-brow yet catchy. Joshua Klein from The A.V. Club recommended Of Human Feelings as the best album for new listeners of Coleman's harmolodics-based music, while Chicago Tribune rock critic Greg Kot included it in his guide for novice jazz listeners; he named it one of the few albums that helped him both become a better listener of rock music and learn how to enjoy jazz. In 2008, New York magazine's Martin Johnson included it in his list of canonical albums from what he felt had been New York's sceneless yet vital jazz of the previous 40 years; Of Human Feelings exuded what he described as a spirit of sophistication with elements of funk, Latin, and African music, all of which were encapsulated by music that retained a jazz identity.

Track listing 
All compositions were written by Ornette Coleman.

Personnel 
Credits are adapted from the album's liner notes.

Musicians
 Denardo Coleman – drums
 Ornette Coleman – alto saxophone, production
 Charlie Ellerbee – guitar
 Bern Nix – guitar
 Jamaaladeen Tacuma – bass guitar
 Calvin Weston – drums

Additional personnel
 Susan Bernstein – cover painting
 Peter Corriston – cover design
 Joe Gastwirt – mastering
 Ron Saint Germain – engineering
 Ron Goldstein – executive direction
 Harold Jarowsky – second engineering
 Steven Mark Needham – photography
 Ken Robertson – tape operation

See also 

 Loft jazz
 Punk jazz

References

Bibliography

External links
 

1982 albums
Antilles Records albums
Ornette Coleman albums
Jazz-funk albums
Funk albums by American artists
Jazz fusion albums by American artists
Instrumental albums
Albums recorded at CBS 30th Street Studio